Saint Joseph's Oratory of Mount Royal is a Roman Catholic minor basilica and national shrine located at 3800 Queen Mary Road in the Côte-des-Neiges neighborhood  on Mount Royal's Westmount Summit in Montreal, Quebec. It is a National Historic Site of Canada and is Canada's largest church, with one of the largest church domes in the world. Founded in 1904 by Saint André Bessette in honour of his patron saint, Saint Joseph, the Oratory is the product of numerous architects and thousands of workers in a process spanning six decades. With its monumental scale, Renaissance Revival facade and contrasting Art Deco interior, the Oratory is recognizable not just in Montreal but around the world, attracting more than 2 million visitors and pilgrims to its steps each year.

The Oratory is the highest building in Montreal, rising more than 30 meters above Mount Royal's summit, allowing it to be seen from many kilometers away. It is one of the few buildings that violates the height restriction under the municipal building code of Montreal, which limits the height of any building, including skyscrapers, from surpassing the height of Mount Royal.

Since 2018, the dome and lantern atop the Oratory have undergone a series of renovations expected to be completed in 2024 by architecture firms Atelier TAG and Architecture49. The C$80 million project will create safe access to the lantern which will allow for an unprecedented 360-degree view over the mountain of the city.

History

Early history
Saint André Bessette, C.S.C. (1845-1937), more commonly known as Brother André, was a monk and a member of the Congregation of Holy Cross who became internationally renowned as a miracle healer. Due to his reputation, in 1904 he was given funding to construct a small chapel on Mount-Royal across from Notre Dame College  to operate out of. The small, Gothic Revival style chapel expanded four times over the next decade with the growing of Brother André's fame and the Congregation decided to fulfill his request to build a basilica in his patron saint, Saint Joseph's honor. The original chapel, measuring 4.5 meters by 5.5 meters still stands today, though it has since been relocated about a hundred meters away to make room for the massive basilica that stands today.

The first phase of the basilica’s construction involved architects Dalbé Viau (1881- 1938) and Alphonse Venne (1875-1934) who had previously done work for the Congregation. From 1914 to 1916, Viau and Venne constructed the crypt church, with seating for 1000, which still stands today and forms the base of the basilica where the massive collection of stairs ends. Between 1924 and 1927, the crypt and building up until the roof were completed in the Renaissance Revival style. Viau and Venne had wanted the dome of the Oratory to resemble that of St. Peter’s Basilica in Rome, and to be smaller than it actually is today; however, they never had the chance to see those plans through as construction was halted with the Great Depression.

After the Great Depression
In 1937, Dom Paul Bellot (1876-1944), born in France, was hired to work after the death of Venne; however, he was required to work through Canadian Lucien Parent (1893-1956) due to not being a registered architect in Quebec. He redesigned Viau and Venne's roof and dome entirely, making the dome significantly larger and modelling it to resemble the dome of Florence Cathedral. The construction of his large Oratory dome lasted four years and was completed in 1941 after involving thousands of workers.

From 1949–1951, architect Gilbert Moreau carried out alterations and improvements to the interior of Saint Joseph's Oratory, as well as to the adjacent monastery, and rearranged the sacristy in the basilica.

Composer Émilien Allard was the church's carillonneur from 1955 to 1975. For RCA Victor he released the LP album Carols at the Carillon of Saint Joseph's Oratory for which he wrote the arrangements.

21st century
On October 19, 2004, the Oratory held its centennial. All the bells of all the churches on the island of Montreal were supposed to ring at 9:00 a.m., though not all churches participated. At 9:05 a.m., the basilica rang its bell in response and celebration.  On April 2, again to commemorate the Oratory's centennial, Canada Post issued 'Saint Joseph's Oratory, Quebec' in the 2004 Tourist Attractions series. The stamp was designed by Catharine Bradbury & William Stewart based on a photograph by Bernard Brault. The 49¢ stamps are perforated kiss cut and were printed by Lowe-Martin Company Inc. That same year, the Oratory was designated a National Historic Site of Canada.

On October 30, 2007, Father Charles Corso, a priest at the Oratory, was faced with a disorganized and depressed man who threatened to kill himself with a handgun. The priest talked with the man and managed to calm him down before police arrived on scene. The man was brought to hospital to undergo psychiatric evaluation.

On March 22, 2019, a 26-year-old man wearing a dark winter coat and light-coloured baseball cap entered the Oratory during the Friday morning mass, rapidly walked up to the centre, and stabbed the celebrating priest, Father Claude Grou. Of the fifty people attending mass, several intervened to neutralize the assailant, before security guards responded. Police officers from the Service de police de la Ville de Montréal quickly arrived on scene and arrested the assaillant who was already detained by security personnel. The assaulted priest suffered only minor injuries, a single stab wound to the chest. That same evening, upon being wheeled out of the Montreal General Hospital, he said, "My health is fine. I’ll take a little rest and I will be back to work when my rest is taken. And the Oratory will remain a place where people can be welcomed. A place of prayers, and a place of calm, and a place of peace - even if there are some moments like that."

Today, the basilica enshrines a venerated statue of Saint Joseph, currently located within the oil-burning chapel that was authorized a Canonical coronation by Pope Pius X on 19 March 1910 via Cardinal Vincenzo Vannutelli. This statue was previously enshrined at the Côte-des-Neiges Chapel and has been moved to the new modern basilica. The same image was ceremonially  crowned for the second time on 9 August 1955 by Pope Pius XII via Cardinal Paul-Émile Léger.

Architecture and structure

When the basilica's construction began in 1914, many architects were challenging the conventional Beaux-Arts style and neoclassicism. This period was also around the time where expressionist architecture, constructivist architecture, Bauhaus ideas and many other facets of modern architecture began to take off, with pioneers like Le Corbusier in Europe and Frank Lloyd Wright in the United States refusing to be categorized by traditional architectural styles. It was certainly atypical for monumental classical church buildings to be constructed in cities around this time, yet Saint Joseph's Oratory was one of the largest buildings in Montreal when it was constructed, and was designed in Renaissance Revival exterior with an Art Deco interior. The basilica, as it stands today, comprises many parts, including the Crypt Church, located underneath the basilica, the Votive Chapel, between the Crypt and the rock of Mount-Royal, the Shrine, which encompasses the nave, apse and transept, and the dome, which is the largest church dome in Canada and the third largest in the world.

During the summer solstice, the setting sun is perfectly aligned with the center line of the main steps that lead up to (and into) the basilica. Every year around that time, people sit on the steps to watch the sunset. The main aisle inside the basilica, and even the cross on the altar, are also in perfect alignment with the setting sun on the longest day of the year. Sunlight enters the basilica through some windows and doors.

Crypt Church
The Crypt Church, originally designed by Viau and Venne, measures , has a seating capacity of 1000 people and is designed in a neoclassical style. The ceiling is supported using the barrel vaulting of steel-reinforced concrete arches. The church is called a "crypt" due to its flattened arches as well as its position embedded into the mountain underneath the basilica. There is a statue of Joseph made out of Carrara marble behind the main altar of the Crypt Church, added in 1917 by the Italian artist A. Giacomini. Eight stained glass windows depicting the stages in Saint Joseph's life were installed in the crypt in 1919 by the Montreal firm Perdriau et O'Shea.

Votive Chapel
Added between 1946–1949 between the Crypt Church and the rock of Mount Royal, the Votive Chapel is designed in Art Deco style from the plans of Lucien Parent, and relies on heavy use of geometric forms (square columns, square paneling on ceiling). The Chapel measures  and contains approximately 10,000 candles, with the central lampstand in front of the statue of Saint Joseph holding approximately 3500 votive candles. The chapel, also referred to as "the Chapel of Ex-votos," has nearly 1000 ex-votos (canes, crutches, etc.) suspended within it, left behind by pilgrims during the life of Brother André. The Chapel also contains eight bas-reliefs designed by Canadian sculptor, Joseph Guardo in 1948, which illustrate eight of the attributes which Christianity has accorded to Saint Joseph. The tomb of Saint André, sculpted in black marble, rests in an alcove in the middle of the Votive Chapel.

Shrine
The interior of the basilica, known as the Shrine, was designed using concepts by Dom Bellot as well as Canadian architect Gérard Notebaert, and uses a Latin cross layout with a dome at the crossing. The nave, which contains pews to seat 2028 people (with a maximum capacity of 10,000 people), measures  in width, while the transept measures  and connects to the shrine of Brother André. The apse, as well as the rest of the interior, is designed in Art Deco style, which was very popular in Montreal during the 1930s, and contains sculptures, bas-reliefs, mosaics and stained glass of religious imagery. The roof of the basilica is held up using reinforced concrete multi-angle arches iconic of Dom Bellot’s style.

The exterior of the Oratory is constructed using large blocks of granite from Lac Mégantic quarries in Quebec. The colonnade at the front façade of the building consists of four -tall, -thick Corinthian columns which provide the structural support for the entablature of the front portico. It is also corniced and ornamented. The staircase which leads from the street to the base of the basilica contain two parallel flights of 283 concrete steps separated by a central flight of 99 wooden steps reserved for pilgrims who wish to climb on their knees.

Dome
The dome of Saint Joseph’s Oratory is the largest church dome in Canada and among the largest and the tallest domes in the world, and this is a result of Dom Bellot’s very inspired and ambitious designs. His plans for the dome are very similar to those of Florence Cathedral, being of a "double shell" design, meaning it consists of two domes, one on the interior and one on the exterior with empty space in between. Like the cathedral in Florence, the outer dome of the Oratory consists of eight pointed arches laying atop an octagonal drum, with a lantern and cross. The concrete shell of the Oratory's dome is so thin in fact that when related to its overall size, it is akin to an eggshell.

There are 16 steel buttresses along the inner walls of the drums that provide the structural support for the dome. They serve to brace the inner dome against the outer dome, thus making the supporting walls for both domes more rigid.

Modern developments
In 2018, the architectural firms Atelier TAG and Architecture49 won a competition organized by Saint Joseph's Oratory to renovate the inside of its dome and its observatory. The project is estimated to cost around $80 million CAD and will also include a complete renovation of the building's museum and the construction of a new welcome centre on Queen Mary road. The lantern will have space for up to 17 visitors at a time and will offer the only 360-degree view over the mountain in the city. As of 2019, renovations are underway.

In popular culture

The 1989 film Jesus of Montreal uses the Oratory as its principal backdrop. A photograph of the Oratory is used for the picture representing Montreal in the Monopoly: Here and Now: The World Edition game.

See also
 List of basilicas in Canada
 List of carillons in Canada
 List of tallest domes

Notes and references

External links

 
Saint Joseph's Oratory - Canadian Conference of Catholic Bishops
 CBC Digital Archives - The Miracle on Mount Royal: 100 Years of St. Joseph's Oratory
 Saint Joseph's Oratory: Photo Gallery by The Catholic Photographer
  Les Merveilles de L'Oratoire: L'Oratoire Saint-Joseph du Mont-Royal, 1904–2004 By Denise Robillard
 Saint Joseph's Oratory in Canadian Encyclopedia

Joseph's Oratory
Carillons
Joseph's Oratory
Côte-des-Neiges–Notre-Dame-de-Grâce
Church buildings with domes
Mount Royal
National Historic Sites in Quebec
Joseph's Oratory
Joseph's Oratory
Joseph's Oratory
Joseph's Oratory
Joseph's Oratory